PAS 78: Guide to good practice in commissioning accessible websites is a Publicly Available Specification published on March 8, 2006 by the British Standards Institution in collaboration with the Disability Rights Commission. It provides guidance to organisations in how to go about commissioning an accessible website from a design agency. It describes what is expected from websites to comply with the UK Disability Discrimination Act 1995, making websites accessible to and usable by disabled people

History

In December 2010, PAS 78 was superseded by the full British Standard that evolved from it: BS 8878:2010 Web accessibility Code of Practice.

BS 8878 continues PAS 78’s emphasis on providing guidance to non-technical website owners for the whole process of commissioning, procuring and producing accessible websites, updating it to handle:
 web 2.0’s much wider purposes for websites (e.g. multimedia sites, software as a service sites) and the move from provider-produced content to user-generated content (e.g. blogs, Facebook, YouTube)
 the increasing range of devices on which websites are viewed (e.g. smartphones, tablets, Internet Protocol television)
 the increasing use of non-W3C technologies to produce websites
 the increasing use of “off the shelf” website builder tools to create websites rather than bespoke development
 the increasing use of on-site accessibility personalisation tools like CSS style-switchers
 the changing organisational structure of web product teams and key personnel impacting product accessibility, especially the growing role of web product managers

Audience

The principal audience are businesses within the UK, but it is a relevant document for charity and volunteer organisations, as well as local and central government. It is also a useful document for web design agencies and web developers as a guide to what is expected of them. It is written from a business perspective and describes the web standards and usability testing needed for producing accessible websites.

At the PAS 78 launch the Disability Rights Commission's Legal Operations Director, Nick O'Brien, confirmed that PAS 78 would be used in supporting evidence in a court case against businesses that run inaccessible websites. Although the Disability Rights Commission has so far been conciliatory rather than litigious towards businesses running inaccessible websites, that approach could now change with the publication of PAS 78.

Rationale 

In April 2004 the Disability Rights Commission published its findings about the accessibility of 1000 UK websites and found that 81% of websites tested failed to reach basic levels of web accessibility (Level A compliance to the W3C's Web Content Accessibility Guidelines). To alleviate the confusion within UK businesses about their obligations under the Disability Discrimination Act 1995, one of the Disability Rights Commission's recommendations was to establish a best practice in how to commission websites that are accessible. PAS 78 is that set of best practice guidelines.

The launch of the Disability Discrimination Act is one of the most significant reason which developed interest in website commissioner's to stress more on developing accessible and user friendly websites. Websites which are accessible also provide the possibilities to broaden a website’s present target audience and also has the ability to reach new audience who are more targeted.

The survey of the family Resources revealed that there are nearly 10 million disabled individuals in the United Kingdom who have a combined investing power around 80 billion pounds per year. Furthermore, it is found that there are millions of other individuals that are affected by sensory, bodily and/or intellectual impairments, which includes those caused by the ageing process.

Research carried out by the Disability Rights Commission “The Web : Access and inclusion with regards to disabled people” confirmed that individuals without any afflictions are also able to make use of websites which are optimized with regards to accessibility better and more effectively.

Content material which is developed keeping in mind the World Wide Web Consortium (W3C) guidelines along with the specifications could be more easily used in other mediums such as television, cell phones, portable computers and on the internet.

Search engines also prefer to rank accessible content material higher in search engine result pages where the text material's equivalent is presented in graphical components.

By ensuring website accessibility], it may lead to good promotion, as interpersonal inclusion leads to a fairer world along with equality associated with opportunity.

Additional business advantages achieved by developing accessible websites available are given on W3C.

Contents

PAS 78 covers the general principles of building an accessible website, along with a discussion of how disabled people use computers and websites. The heart of the document covers the Web technologies (HTML, CSS, JavaScript), as well as rich media format (such as PDF, Flash, audio and video). The section on testing covers technical testing (page validation) as well as user testing, including testing with disabled people. The last section covers contracting external companies, focusing on choosing a website developer.

The supplementary documentation contains a number of resources including suggested user profiles for building up test cases, success criteria, suggested questions for web design agencies, available accreditation schemes, how to select a content management system and a collection of references including organisations and books about web accessibility.

Comparison with Section 508 

Section 508 is part of the US Rehabilitation Act which required Federal Agencies to make their electronic and information technology accessible to people with disabilities. It does this by setting out checkpoints that need to be met for a website to be accessible. This is much like the W3C's Web Content Accessibility Guidelines version 1.0.

PAS 78 does not define any new standards or guidelines. It is an umbrella document, or summary document that describes the use of existing web standards and technologies. It currently references the W3C's Web Content Accessibility Guidelines, as well as promoting the use of structured markup, avoiding presentational attributes, and advises the use of CSS layouts. In essence, PAS 78 advocates the use of existing web standards.

Their approach to PDF and Flash is that it should be used when it is the most appropriate formats for delivering content. It should be used when it benefits the end user, not the content authors.

References

External links 
 BSI: PAS 78 Guide to Good Practice in Commissioning Accessible Websites
 EHRC: PAS 78 Guide to Good Practice in Commissioning Accessible Websites (free to download in multiple formats; checked 2010/07/13)
 DRC: DRC web investigation finds many public websites 'impossible' for disabled people to use
 UK Disability Discrimination Act, Part III
 Section 508 of the US Rehabilitation Act
 BBC: New standards for website access
 out-law: How to commission an accessible website
 Bruce Lawson: PAS 78: Guide to good practice in commissioning accessible websites
 Joe Clark: A critique of PAS 78

Web accessibility
British Standards